Hordaland Police District (Norwegian: Hordaland politidisrikt) is headquartered in Bergen, Norway. In the police district are approximately 454,000 inhabitants.

Jurisdiction
The police district covers the municipalities: Askøy, Austevoll, Austrheim, Bergen, Eidfjord, Fedje, Fjell, Fusa, Granvin, Gulen, Jondal, Kvam, Kvinnherad, Lindås, Masfjorden, Meland, Modalen, Odda, Os, Osterøy, Radøy, Samnanger, Sund, Tysnes, Ullensvang, Ulvik, Vaksdal, Voss and Øygarden in the county of Hordaland.

In the second largest police district in Norway, after Oslo, and there are four police stations in the city of Bergen (north, south, west and central Bergen) and eleven sheriff's offices (lensmannskontor in Norwegian) in other parts of the county.

See also 
Norwegian Police Service

References

Police districts in Norway
Organisations based in Bergen